O Jong-ae (born January 17, 1984) is a female weightlifter from North Korea.

At the 2007 World Weightlifting Championships she won the bronze medal in the 58 kg category, lifting 227 kg in total.

She won the silver medal in the 58 kg category at the 2008 Summer Olympics, with 226 kg in total.

References

External links
 Athlete Biography at beijing2008

Living people
1984 births
North Korean female weightlifters
Olympic weightlifters of North Korea
Weightlifters at the 2008 Summer Olympics
Olympic bronze medalists for North Korea
Olympic medalists in weightlifting
Weightlifters at the 2010 Asian Games
Medalists at the 2008 Summer Olympics
Universiade medalists in weightlifting
Universiade gold medalists for North Korea
Asian Games competitors for North Korea
World Weightlifting Championships medalists
Medalists at the 2011 Summer Universiade
20th-century North Korean women
21st-century North Korean women